Millender Center station is a Detroit People Mover station in Downtown Detroit, Michigan.  It is located inside the Millender Center complex at Level 5. It serves the Courtyard by Marriott hotel and residential apartments. The building is also connected by two separate skywalks to the Renaissance Center and the Coleman A. Young Municipal Center.

See also

 List of rapid transit systems
 List of United States rapid transit systems by ridership
 Metromover
 Transportation in metropolitan Detroit

References

External links
 DPM station overview
Station from Google Maps Street View

Detroit People Mover stations
Railway stations in the United States opened in 1987
1987 establishments in Michigan